

Overall records

Biggest wins

Biggest losses

Most consecutive wins
9, 16 July - 9 September 2011

Most consecutive losses
8, 21 August 2021 - 10 April 2022
8, 7 August 2022 - Present
7, 22 March - 18 May 2013
7, 29 April - 23 June 2017
7, 28 May - 30 July 2022

Biggest comeback
Recovered from a 24-point deficit.
Trailed Newcastle Knights 24–0 after 26 minutes to win 36–32 at Campbelltown Stadium (11 August 2001).

Worst collapse
Surrendered a 23-point lead.
Led Penrith Panthers 31–8 after 57 minutes to lose 32–31 at Penrith Football Stadium (4 June 2000).

Win–loss record

Individual Records
Current players in bold

Most first grade matches

as at 19 March 2023

Most matches as captain

as at 19 March 2023

Most tries in a match
4, Kevin McGuinness against South Sydney Rabbitohs at Aussie Stadium (4 August 2002)
4, Marika Koroibete against Parramatta Eels at Campbelltown Stadium (6 August 2012)
4, Keith Lulia against Canterbury-Bankstown Bulldogs at ANZ Stadium (20 July 2014)

Most goals in a match
9, Brett Hodgson against Canterbury Bulldogs at Telstra Stadium (19 August 2005)
9, Brett Hodgson against North Queensland Cowboys at Telstra Stadium (9 September 2005)

Most points in a match
30 (3 tries, 9 goals), Brett Hodgson against North Queensland Cowboys at Telstra Stadium (9 September 2005)
26 (3 tries, 7 goals), Paul Momirovski against St George-Illawarra Dragons at Sydney Cricket Ground (1 September 2019)
24 (2 tries, 8 goals), Benji Marshall against Cronulla-Sutherland Sharks at Endeavour Field (16 August 2009)
22 (1 try, 9 goals), Brett Hodgson against Canterbury-Bankstown Bulldogs at Stadium Australia (19 August 2005)
22 (2 tries, 7 goals), Pat Richards against Gold Coast Titans at Robina Stadium (16 March 2014)

Most tries in a season

Most points in a season

Most tries for club

as at 19 March 2023

Most tries by position

Most points for club

as at 19 March 2023

Individual Club Honours

Wests Tigers Player of the Year
2000 - Tyran Smith
2001 - Ben Galea
2002 - John Skandalis
2003 - Anthony Laffranchi
2004 - Brett Hodgson
2005 - Scott Prince and Brett Hodgson
2006 - Robbie Farah
2007 - Robbie Farah
2009 - Gareth Ellis
2010 - Gareth Ellis
2011 - Gareth Ellis
2012 - Aaron Woods
2013 - Liam Fulton
2014 - Aaron Woods
2015 - James Tedesco
2016 - Mitchell Moses
2017 - Elijah Taylor
2018 - Luke Brooks
2019 - Luke Brooks
2020 - David Nofoaluma
2021 - Luke Brooks and Daine Laurie
2022 - Joe Ofahengaue

Rookie Of the Year
2006 - Shannon McDonnell
2007 - Chris Lawrence
2008 - Tim Moltzen
2009 - Blake Ayshford
2010 - Simon Dwyer
2012 - Marika Koroibete and Curtis Sironen
2013 - James Tedesco
2014 - Luke Brooks
2015 - Kyle Lovett
2016 - Josh Aloiai
2017 - Jacob Liddle
2018 - Esan Marsters
2019 - Thomas Mikaele
2020 - Harry Grant
2021 - Stefano Utoikamanu
2022 - Fonua Pole

See also

List of NRL records

References

External links

Records
Sydney-sport-related lists
National Rugby League lists
Australian records
Rugby league records and statistics